The list of shipwrecks in 1893 includes ships sunk, foundered, grounded, or otherwise lost during 1893.

January

6 January

16 January

Unknown date

February

2 February

4 February

13 February

19 February

21 February

22 February

Unknown date

March

3 March

7 March

21 March

23 March

24 March

26 March

27 March

30 March

April

4 April

6 April

11 April

21 April

28 April

30 April

May

10 May

14 May

17 May

21 May

23 May

26 May

June

2 June

21 June

22 June

24 June

Unknown date

July

2 July

3 July

9 July

21 July

August

5 August

7 August

13 August

21 August

23 August

24 August

Unknown date

September

1 September

5 September

7 September

13 September

22 September

23 September

25 September

27 September

30 September

October

6 October

13 October

14 October

16 October

21 October

24 October

November

3 November

6 November

7 November

11 November

17 November

18 November

22 November

24 November

December

3 December

5 December

8 December

12 December

13 December

16 December

20 December

28 December

Unknown date

References

See also 

1893